My Gal Sal is a 1942 American musical film. It may also refer to:

My Gal Sal (aircraft), the nickname of a restored World War II B-17E-BO Flying Fortress
"My Gal Sal", a 1905 song composed by Paul Dresser, the subject of the 1942 film